Cyprus (CYP) competed at the 2005 Mediterranean Games in Almería, Spain with a total number of 36 participants (23 men and 13 women).

Medals

Silver
 Boxing
Men's Featherweight (– 57 kg): Ovidiu Bobîrnat

Results by event
 Boxing
Men's Featherweight (– 57 kg)
 Ovidiu Bobîrnat
Men's Welterweight (– 69 kg)
 Yury Dabrynski
Men's Super Heavyweight (+91 kg)
 Costas Philippou

See also
 Cyprus at the 2004 Summer Olympics
 Cyprus at the 2008 Summer Olympics

References
 Official Site

Nations at the 2005 Mediterranean Games
2005
Mediterranean Games